Wilmington, South Australia is a town and  locality

Wilmington, South Australia may also refer to.

District Council of Wilmington, a former local government area
Wilmington railway line, a former railway line
Wilmington Primary School - refer List of schools in South Australia#U-Z (GP)

See also
Wilmington (disambiguation)